The Five Great Clans of the New Territories are five families that settled early and became sizeable in the New Territories of Hong Kong.

They are the Tang (Deng), the Man (Wen), Hau (Hou), Pang (Peng) and Liu (Liao).

The Hau Clan arrived in modern-day Hong Kong towards the end of the 12th century, during the Southern Song Dynasty. They first settled at Ho Sheung Heung. They later settled three branch-villages: Yin Kong, Kam Tsin and Ping Kong.

See also 
 Chinese kin

References

Citations

Sources 

 

Families of Hong Kong
Culture of Hong Kong
Chinese clans